Namyit Island, also known as ; Binago Island; Mandarin , is the third-largest island on Tizard Bank in the northwest of the Spratly Islands in South China Sea. The island is also claimed by China (PRC), the Philippines, and Taiwan (ROC).

History in the 20th century
Although two South Vietnamese warships (the HQ-04 Tuy Dong and HQ-05 Tay Ket) stopped at Namyit Island in 1962, South Vietnamese troops did not set up a permanent garrison on the islet until August 1973. On 6 September 1973, the Republic of Vietnam's Ministry of the Interior signed Decree No. 420-BNV/HCĐP/26 merging some Spratly islands, including Namyit, into Phuoc Hai Commune, Dat Do District, Phuoc Tuy Province. South Vietnam continued to administer the entity until 27 April 1975 when their troops were evicted by the Vietnam People's Army.

Geography
There is a heliport at the end of island.

Namyit Island Light is a white round tower with red bands standing  in height.

Ecology
Namyit Island has no source of fresh water, and its coral sand is not suitable for plants in general. The island is covered with small trees, bushes and grass and is inhabited by sea birds. The surrounding water is home to 492 species of plankton, 86 species of seaweed, two species of seagrass, 225 species of benthic organisms, 160 species of coral, 414 species of reef fish and two species of sea turtles.

See also
Trường Sa District
Spratly Islands dispute

References

External links
Maritime Transparency Initiative Island Tracker
Namyit Island, Google Maps

Islands of the Spratly Islands
Tizard Bank